Echols is a surname. Notable people with the surname include:

Alice Echols, American cultural critic and historian
Antwun Echols (born 1971), American boxer
Brandin Echols (born 1997), American football player
Cameron Echols (born 1981), American basketball player
Charlie Echols, American jazz trumpeter and bandleader
Damien Echols (born 1974), one of the West Memphis Three
Dorothy Jung Echols (1916–1977), American geologist 
Douglas Echols, American man wrongfully convicted of rape
Edward Echols (1849–1914), American politician
Emily Echols (born 1988), American jurist
Fate Echols (1939–2002), American football player
Harrison "Hatch" Echols (1933–1993), American molecular biologist, biochemist, and geneticist
Jennifer Echols, American writer
Joe Echols (1917–1977), American football coach
John Echols (disambiguation) multiple people including:
John Echols (1823–1896), Confederate general
Johnny Echols (born 1947), American singer-songwriter and guitarist
Johnny Echols (baseball) (1917–1972), American baseball player
Jon Echols (born 1979), American politician
Joseph Hubbard Echols (1816–1885), American politician
Lathan Moses Echols (born 2002), better known as Lil Mosey, American rapper
Leonard S. Echols (1871–1946), American politician
Michael Echols, American politician
Mike Echols (1944–2003), American writer
Mike Echols (American football) (born 1978), American football player
M. Patton Echols (1925–2012), American politician
Odis Echols (1930–2013), American politician, radio broadcaster and lobbyist
Oliver P. Echols (1892–1954), American military officer
Paul C. Echols (1944–1994), American musicologist and conductor
Robert L. Echols (born 1941), American judge
Robert Milner Echols (1798–1847), American politician
Sheila Echols (born 1964), American athlete
Terry Echols (born 1962), American football player
Tim Echols, American politician
Vanessa Echols (born 1960), American television journalist
William Holding Echols (1859–1934), American academic